Simon Ehammer (born 7 February 2000) is an athlete who competes internationally for Switzerland. His last victory is the men's decathlon in the 2019 European Athletics U20 Championships. He competes in 110 m hurdles, decathlon, heptathlon and long jump.
He won the long jump event at the 2021 European Athletics U23 Championships and was the bronze medalist in the long jump at the 2022 World Athletics Championships.

International competitions

References

External links

Swiss decathletes
2000 births
Living people
World Athletics Indoor Championships medalists
21st-century Swiss people
World Athletics Championships athletes for Switzerland
World Athletics Championships medalists
European Athletics Championships medalists